The surname Via may refer to:

 Angela Via, singer and songwriter
 Dennis L. Via (born c. 1958), US Army General (4-star)
 Elizabeth Jane Via, American lawyer and one of 32 (as of August 2008) women ordained in the Roman Catholic Womenpriests (RCWP) movement, which is not sanctioned by the Roman Catholic Church
 Hunter Via (born 1976), American film and television editor